"The Gymnast" is the 92nd episode of Seinfeld. This was the sixth episode for the sixth season. It aired on November 3, 1994, during a special "Blackout Thursday" night on NBC, in which all shows in the Must See TV line-up, except this one, featured a fictional New York City blackout (e.g., Friends episode "The One with the Blackout"). The episode instead deals with Jerry's sexual relationship with an Olympic gymnast, Mr. Pitt's fixation on an autostereogram painting, Kramer’s reaction to pain caused by a kidney stone, and George's repeatedly being caught in vagrant-like behavior by his girlfriend's mother.

Plot
Jerry is dating Katya, a Romanian gymnast who won a silver medal at the 1984 Olympics, but they have little to talk about. Kramer brings a video recording of Katya's performance in 1984 Olympics which is very impressive and it encourages Jerry to continue the relationship, since he is confident a gymnast would have great sexual prowess. But their sexual tryst is completely mundane, and Elaine says that now that they have slept together he is committed to dating Katya for at least three more weeks.

Kramer goes to Mr. Pitt's office to retrieve his 3-D autostereogram painting that Elaine had framed, but Kramer has to rush out when he suffers pain from a kidney stone. Mr. Pitt becomes so obsessed with the painting and his inability to see the 3-D image that he sends Elaine to a merger meeting between the Morgan Springs and Poland Creek bottled water companies in his stead. Elaine scoffs at the proposed post-merger name "Moland Springs", inadvertently launching a dispute and putting the merger in jeopardy.

George is still dating Lindsay. When he goes to her mother Mrs. Enright's house for lunch, he impresses her with his gentlemanly demeanor. However, she is horrified when she walks in on him taking a partially eaten chocolate éclair out of the garbage can and eating it. George calls Lindsay and asks for another chance. Later on the street, George discards an unwanted cup of coffee onto a car windshield. The driver demands that he clean it off, which he does with a piece of newspaper. He is spotted by Mrs. Enright, who runs away, convinced that he is a vagrant.

Jerry and Kramer go to the circus with Katya to watch her friend Misha the tightrope walker. In the restroom, Kramer passes his kidney stone, screaming so loudly that he makes Misha fall from the high wire. Katya breaks up with Jerry, declaring that she was only dating him because she thought comedians have great sexual prowess, and was disappointed by his sexual performance.

George, who likes to take his shirt off when he goes to the bathroom, attends a party at Lindsay's house. He goes to the bathroom and is so distracted by a 3-D painting they have that he forgets to put his shirt back on. He walks out of the bathroom topless in front of all her guests, much to the shock of Lindsay and her mother.

Elaine, her hands covered in ink from a broken fountain pen, angrily breaks the 3-D painting and shakes Mr. Pitt out of his obsession. He gets some of her ink on his face and rushes off to an important merger meeting, where he makes a fist-pounding impassioned speech in which he remarks "We will Annex Poland by the spring at any cost", which combined with the ink under his nose makes him resemble Adolf Hitler.

Critical response
Barbara Ching wrote about Katya's expectations, "The comedian, in other words, embodies a procreative life force that Jerry negates. The laughter he provokes leads to nothing but a one-night stand." Dr. Michael Dunne wrote in his essay "Seinfeld as Intertextual Comedy":

David Sims of The A.V. Club gave the episode an A- and wrote, "This is one of those Seinfeld episodes that disguises just how callous Jerry is being towards a woman through script innuendo ... George's plot feeds in nicely from last week, which was like a prelude to the imbecility on show this week. He inexplicably keeps getting chances with Lindsay despite ridiculous behavior like eating out of the trash and looking like a squeegee man, as if his ability to explain his way out of situations is messing with the universe's attempts to end the relationship."

References

External links 
 

Seinfeld (season 6) episodes
1994 American television episodes